Maksymilian Koźmin (19 February 1906 – 20 July 1983) was a Polish footballer. He played in two matches for the Poland national football team from 1930 to 1931.

References

External links
 

1906 births
1983 deaths
Polish footballers
Poland international footballers
Place of birth missing
Association footballers not categorized by position